Crookston is a city in the U.S. state of Minnesota. It is the county seat of Polk County. The population was 7,482 at the 2020 census. It is part of the "Grand Forks, ND-MN Metropolitan Statistical Area" or "Greater Grand Forks".

Crookston is the episcopal seat of the Roman Catholic Diocese of Crookston. Crookston is partially a commuter town to the larger city of Grand Forks, North Dakota.

History

Early history
The Crookston area was virtually unoccupied until European contact and remained little more than a hunting ground associated with the Pembina settlements until the 1860s. The land in Crookston's immediate vicinity is not connected with any verifiable Native American or European historic events or circumstances until transfer in the Treaties of Old Crossing in 1863–64. Before that, the territory now included in Crookston was part of Rupert's Land and Assiniboia before becoming part of the United States as a result of the boundary settlement in the Treaty of 1818.

The Crookston area was traversed by trappers and traders, including Ojibwa and Lakota Indians, Métis, and other mixed-race people as well as white men between 1790 and 1870. A branch of the Red River Trails passed nearby; it was used by fur traders between the 1840s and 1870s.

Settlement
The present-day site of Crookston first saw settlement by non-Indian people around 1872. It was the site of a federal land office by 1876 and sited on a portion of the Great Northern Railway that began operation by 1880. The town was incorporated on April 1, 1879 as "Queen City". By the end of that year, the town had a jail, graded streets, and a few plank sidewalks. Soon it was decided that the town needed a new name. Two factions emerged supporting two different names. One wished to honor the town's first mayor, Captain Ellerey C. Davis, with the name Davis. Another group picked the name Crookston to honor Colonel William Crooks, a soldier and railroad builder. The name was reportedly chosen by coin toss.

Soon Scandinavian and German immigrants began populating Crookston. At one point, eight different railroad lines reached the town, and it became a center of commerce and manufacturing.

Geography
Crookston sits in the fertile Red River Valley, once a part of glacial Lake Agassiz. As Lake Agassiz receded, it left behind rich mineral deposits. This made the area around Crookston prime for agricultural uses. Grains such as wheat and other crops, including sugar beets and potatoes grow well in the area around Crookston.

Crookston has a relatively flat landscape. The Red Lake River flows through the city and makes several twists and turns (oxbows). The riverbank has eroded somewhat.

U.S. Highways 2 and 75 and Minnesota State Highways 9 and 102 are four of the main routes in the community.

Crookston is the northern terminus of the Agassiz Recreational Trail, a 53-mile multi-use trail built on an abandoned railroad grade that has its southern terminus at Ulen.

Climate

Demographics

Crookston has not seen major population growth since the 1970s. The economy has suffered due to a lack of well-paying jobs and available housing.

2010 census
As of the census of 2010, there were 7,891 people, 3,109 households, and 1,743 families living in the city. The racial makeup of the city was 90.2% White, 1.4% African American, 1.7% Native American, 1.6% Asian, 2.8% from other races, and 2.3% from two or more races. Hispanic or Latino of any race were 11.0% of the population.

There were 3,109 households, of which 28.5% had children under the age of 18 living with them. 40.3% were married couples living together, 11.1% had a female householder with no husband present, 4.7% had a male householder with no wife present, and 43.9% were non-families. 36.7% of all households were made up of individuals, and 13.3% had someone living alone who was 65 years of age or older. The average household size was 2.27 and the average family size was 2.97.

The median age in the city was 35.1 years. 22.3% of residents were under the age of 18; 16.7% were between the ages of 18 and 24; 20.5% were from 25 to 44; 25% were from 45 to 64; and 15.5% were 65 years of age or older. The gender makeup of the city was 49.4% male and 50.6% female.

2000 census
As of the census of 2000, there were 8,192 people, 3,078 households, and 1,819 families living in the city. The racial makeup of the city was 90.5% White, 0.50% African American, 1.54% Native American, 0.49% Asian, 0.02% Pacific Islander, 4.64% from other races, and 1.56% from two or more races. Hispanic or Latino of any race were 8.18% of the population.

There were 3,078 households, of which 30.5% had children under the age of 18 living with them, 46.5% were married couples living together, 9.6% had a female householder with no husband present, and 40.9% were non-families. 34.5% of all households were made up of individuals, and 15.5% had someone living alone who was 65 years of age or older. The average household size was 2.37 and the average family size was 3.10.

The city's age distribution shows 24.2% under the age of 18, 14.9% from 18 to 24, 23.8% from 25 to 44, 19.5% from 45 to 64, and 17.6% who were 65 years of age or older. The median age was 36 years. For every 100 females, there were 93.4 males. For every 100 females age 18 and over, there were 91.5 males.

The median income for a household in the city was $34,609, and the median income for a family was $44,157. Males had a median income of $30,564 versus $21,021 for females. The per capita income for the city was $17,219. About 7.5% of families and 12.5% of the population were below the poverty line, including 14.4% of those under age 18 and 14.7% of those age 65 or over.

Education

Crookston has the University of Minnesota Crookston (a campus of the University of Minnesota system). It began as an agricultural high school before becoming a two-year college and then a four-year university. On January 30, 2010, the new Crookston Sports Center was dedicated.

Crookston is in Crookston School District 593, and is home to Crookston High School, home of the Pirates. Students from the neighboring towns of Euclid, Gentilly, and Mentor attend Crookston High. The school district enrolls about 1,600 students in K-12. Before the new high school was built in 1997, students attended Central High School in downtown Crookston. Central High School had been in operation since 1913.

Private elementary schools include Cathedral Elementary (Catholic, formerly Mount Saint Benedict high school), Our Savior's Lutheran, and Bible Baptist.

Media
The local newspaper is the Crookston Daily Times.

Television
Crookston is part of the Fargo/Grand Forks television market. PBS member station KCGE-DT (channel 16) is licensed to Crookston, serving Grand Forks.

Local radio stations
KROX 1260 AM (also broadcast locally on translator K289CE 105.7 FM) specifically covers the community. Radio stations from Grand Forks, Thief River Falls, and KRJB 106.5 FM broadcasting from Ada can also be easily received. Radio stations KQHT 96.1 FM and KYCK 97.1 FM are also licensed to Crookston, but broadcast from Grand Forks and serve the region in general.

Culture
Crookston is home to the Grand Theater, the oldest continuously operating movie theater in the United States. Built in 1910, it served as an opera house until 1917, when it began to primarily show movies. It played host to entertainers including early film actress Mary Pickford.

Notable people

 Dan Anderson, professional basketball player, was born in Crookston in 1943.
 Joseph H. Ball, U.S. senator from Minnesota from 1940 to 1949, was born in Crookston in 1905.
 John Christgau (1934–2018), an American author of fiction and non-fiction.
 Ronald N. Davies, judge of the United States District Court for the District of North Dakota, 1955–1985, was born in Crookston in 1904.
 Philip Hamre, medical technician and Minnesota state legislator
 Miner A. Helgeson, farmer and Minnesota state legislator
 Leroy E. Matson, Minnesota Supreme Court justice
 John Noah, ice hockey player, was born in Crookston in 1927.
 Milton Orville Thompson, NASA astronaut and research scientist, was born in Crookston in 1926.
 Julius Spokely, sheriff and Minnesota state legislator
 Theodore W. Thorson, Minnesota state legislator and educator, was born in Crookston in 1922.
 Wes Westrum, played for the New York Giants.
 Ed Widseth, played for the New York Giants.
 Harvey A. Wilder (1907–1968), farmer and Minnesota state legislator

References

External links

City of Crookston
Crookston Convention & Visitor's Bureau
Crookston Photo Gallery
Crookston Daily Times
For text of the initial Treaty of Old Crossing (1863), see WikiSource and the  University of Texas.
For text of the 1864 supplement to the 1863 treaty, known as the Treaty of Old Crossing (1864), see WikiSource and the  University of Texas.

 
Cities in Minnesota
Cities in Polk County, Minnesota
Greater Grand Forks
County seats in Minnesota